Empress Wei may refer to:

Wei Zifu (died 91 BC), empress of the Han dynasty
Empress Dowager Wei (Later Liang) ( 401), empress dowager of the Later Liang state
Empress Wei (Tang dynasty) (died 710), consort and empress dowager of the Tang dynasty

Wei